The Polo Fields is a large multi-purpose stadium and sporting field in San Francisco's Golden Gate Park. Despite its name, polo is rarely played on the Polo Fields.  The facility has a multitude of uses. There are six regulation soccer pitches on the grass field, surrounded by a .67-mile cycle track. Wooden bleachers flank the north and south sides of the cycle track surrounding the field. Surrounding the grass field, cycle track, and bleachers is a  dirt track used for running and horse riding.

History
The Polo Fields has been the site of diverse events over the years. The Polo Fields was originally called the Golden Gate Park Stadium and opened in 1906 as a velodrome.   Cyclists from all over the West Coast have used the track for over a century. In 1967, the Human Be-In  counterculture music concert was held on the Polo Fields.
The Polo Fields was also the home field for San Francisco-based rugby clubs in the Northern California Rugby Football Union from the 1960s through the early 1990s.  It was the site of the Golden Gate Rugby Tournament, held in April, during this time.

Tenants
Cycling, soccer and cross country running events are frequently held on the Polo Fields all year long.  The annual Outside Lands Music and Arts Festival is held on the Polo Fields each August. From 1986 to 2009, the annual Bay to Breakers footrace held its post-race event, Footstock, at the Polo Fields each May.

Cycling Track
The historic cycling track at the Polo Fields was a 1 kilometer long paved track used by cyclists for training and events. The cycling track was a centerpoint of bicycle racing from the 1930s through the 1950s.

The local group Friends of the Polo Field was recently formed to restore the cycling track to the original condition when it was created.

See also
Hardly Strictly Bluegrass
San Francisco Soccer Football League

References

External links
 San Francisco Recreation & Parks Department

Sports venues in San Francisco
Athletics (track and field) venues in San Francisco
Cross country running courses in California
Soccer venues in San Francisco
Sports complexes in the United States
Golden Gate Park